Bryan Visbal (born August 9, 1985) is a Colombian musician, singer and songwriter who is the former vocalist of the band Los De Adentro (Those that are in).

Biography
Bryan Visbal was born in New York City on August 9, 1985, the son of Martha Iglesias and Ricardo Visbal. Coming from a family well known in the city of Barranquilla, Colombia, in a musical group called "Colores del Tiempo", composed of all Visbal Rosales brothers.

X Factor
Bryan Visbal together with his band "The Fotones" became part of the reality show in Colombia X Factor. He got into the last 7 participants when he was eliminated. After 6 months he received a proposal to become the Lead singer of "Los de Adentro", which he accepted.

Los de Adentro
In 2007 he entered to make part of the renowned Colombian rock band "Los de Adentro" with which performed a song called "Se Apaga el Silencio". Four of the songs were postulated the first place in the national broadcasters.
The album was produced by the band at that time which consisted of Eliuth Martinez, Johann Daccarett and Bryan Visbal. The co-production on "Mira" consisted of Einar Scaff, creator of the fusion of rhythms with rock. Along with "Los de Adentro" released a second album as LDA, being a re-edition of the disc.

In 2010, Visbal left the band to pursue a solo career.

2010-Present
Visbal is recording his album with producer Jose Madero Visbal, and is preparing for a national tour. His first single """Volverte A Ver""" is on Desde Cero.

Discography

References
 El tiempo
 El Espectador
 Los 40 Principales
 El Espectador
 El Colombiano
 Terra
 Play it Yet

1985 births
Living people
Colombian rock singers
Musicians from New York City